The sixth season of Calle 7 was a Chilean television program, shown by TVN from Monday to Friday at 6 pm. It was last co-hosted by Jean Philippe Crettonand involved two teams of young adult contenders participating in unique challenges and performing arts to win a top prize at the end of the competition.

Competition after

Contestants

Competition table

Elimination order

Artistic Competition

elimination table

References

External links 
 Official website

2011 Chilean television seasons